The second government of Felipe González was formed on 26 July 1986, following the latter's election as Prime Minister of Spain by the Congress of Deputies on 23 July and his swearing-in on 24 July, as a result of the Spanish Socialist Workers' Party (PSOE) emerging as the largest parliamentary force at the 1986 Spanish general election.

The cabinet comprised members of the PSOE (including its sister party, the Socialists' Party of Catalonia, PSC) and a number of independents. It was automatically dismissed on 30 October 1989 as a consequence of the 1989 general election, but remained in acting capacity until the next government was sworn in.

Investiture

Council of Ministers
The Council of Ministers was structured into the offices for the prime minister, the deputy prime minister and 15 ministries. The number of ministries was increased to 17 with the creation of the Ministry of Social Affairs and the Ministry of the Spokesperson of the Government in July 1988.

Departmental structure
Felipe González's second government was organised into several superior and governing units, whose number, powers and hierarchical structure varied depending on the ministerial department.

Unit/body rank
() Secretary of state
() Undersecretary
() Director-general
() Autonomous agency
() Military & intelligence agency

Notes

References

External links
Governments. Juan Carlos I (20.11.1975 ...). CCHS-CSIC (in Spanish).
Governments of Spain 1982–1996. Ministers of Felipe González. Historia Electoral.com (in Spanish).
The governments of the first period of the Spanish Socialist Workers' Party (1982–1996). Lluís Belenes i Rodríguez History Page (in Spanish).

1986 establishments in Spain
1989 disestablishments in Spain
Cabinets established in 1986
Cabinets disestablished in 1989
Council of Ministers (Spain)